The Dharug language, also spelt Darug, Dharuk, and other variants, and also known as the Sydney language, Gadigal language (Sydney city area), is an Australian Aboriginal language of the Yuin–Kuric group that was traditionally spoken in the region of Sydney, New South Wales. It is the traditional language of the Dharug people. The Dharug population has greatly diminished since the onset of colonisation.  Eora language has sometimes been used to distinguish a coastal dialect from hinterland dialects, but there is no evidence that Aboriginal peoples ever used this term, which simply means "people". It was previously thought extinct, but a few speakers remained and the language is being revived as a spoken language.

Name
The speakers did not use a specific name for their language prior to settlement by the First Fleet. The coastal dialect has been referred to as Iyora (also spelt as Iora or Eora), which simply means "people" (or Aboriginal people), while the inland dialect has been referred to as Dharug, a term of unknown origin or meaning. Linguist and anthropologist Jakelin Troy (2019) describes two dialects of the Sydney language,  with neither Dharug (S64) Eora being in the historical record as language names.

A website devoted to Dharug and Dharawal resources says "The word Daruk was assigned to the Iyura (Eora) people as a language group, or more commonly referred to as the people that sustained their diet by the constant digging of the yams as a vegetable supplement. The Dark, Darug, Tarook, Taruk Tarug is related to the word Midyini, meaning yam".

History

Historical area
The traditional territory of the coastal variety ("Iyora/Eyora", or Kuringgai) was estimated by Val Attenbrow (2002) to include "...the Sydney Peninsula (north of Botany Bay, south of Port Jackson, west to Parramatta), as well as the country to the north of Port Jackson, possibly as far as Broken Bay". 

Attenbrow places the "hinterland dialect" (Dharug) "...on the Cumberland Plain from Appin in the south to the Hawkesbury River in the north; west of the Georges River, Parramatta, the Lane Cove River and Berowra Creek". R. H. Mathews (1903) said that the territory extended "...along the coast to the Hawkesbury River, and inland to what are now the towns of Windsor, Penrith, Campbelltown".

Eora people

The word “Eora” has been used as an ethnonym by non-Aboriginal people since the late 19th century, and by Aboriginal people since the late 20th century, to describe Aboriginal peoples of the Sydney region, despite there being "no evidence that Aboriginal people had used it in 1788 as the name of a language or group of people inhabiting the Sydney peninsula".

With a traditional heritage spanning thousands of years, approximately 70 per cent of the Eora people died out during the nineteenth century as a result of the genocidal policies of colonial Australia, smallpox and other viruses, and the destruction of their natural food sources.

Earliest habitation
Radiocarbon dating suggests human activity occurred in and around Sydney for at least 30,000 years, in the Upper Paleolithic period. However, numerous Aboriginal stone tools found in Sydney's far western suburbs gravel sediments were dated to be from 45,000 to 50,000 years BP, which would mean that humans could have been in the region earlier than thought.

First European records
Dharug people recognise William Dawes of the First Fleet and flagship, the Sirius, as the first to record the original traditional tongue of the elder people of Sydney Dharugule-wayaun. Dawes was returned to England in December 1791, after disagreements with Governor Phillip on, among other things, the punitive expedition launched following the wounding of the Government gamekeeper, allegedly by Pemulwuy, a Yora man.

Loss of language
The Indigenous population of Sydney gradually started using English more in everyday usage, as well as New South Wales Pidgin. This, combined with social upheaval, meant that the local Dharug language started to fade from use in the late nineteenth/early twentieth century. A wordlist of the local Sydney language was published by William Ridley in 1875, and he noted that, at that time, very few fluent speakers were left.

Revival

The Dharug language had largely been lost, mainly due to the historical effects of colonisation on the speakers. Some vocabulary had been retained by some Dharug people, but only very little grammar and phonology. For many years non-Aboriginal academics collected resources for Aboriginal languages to preserve them, and more recently, Aboriginal people have been getting involved in the process, and designing tools to reclaim the languages. During the 1990s and the new millennium, some descendants of the Dharug clans in Western Sydney have been making considerable efforts to revive Dharug as a spoken language. In the 21st century, some modern Dharug speakers have given speeches in a reconstructed form of the Dharug language, and younger members of the community visit schools and give demonstrations of spoken Dharug.
 
A recreated version of the language is spoken at welcome ceremonies conducted by the Dharug people.

As of 2005, some children at Chifley College's Dunheved campus in Sydney had started learning the reconstructed Dharug language, and parts of the language have been taught at the Sydney Festival.

In December 2020 Olivia Fox sang a version of Australia's national anthem in Dharug at Tri Nations Test match between Australia and Argentina.

Phonology

Consonants

Vowels

The language may have had a distinction of vowel length, but this is difficult to determine from the extant data.

Examples
The Dharug language highlights the strong link between people and place through its clan naming convention. This can be seen through the suffix identifier -gal and -galyan which refer to -man of and -woman of.

Clan names such as Burramuttagal (identifying the people) therefore translate to man of Burramutta - also known as Parramatta (identifying the place those specific people are from); Gadigal (identifying the people), man of Gadi - Sydney within Gadigal Country (identifying the place those specific people are from); and, Kamaygalyan (identifying the people), woman of Kamay - Botany Bay (identifying the place those specific people are from). This people-and-place naming convention within the Dharug language can be seen throughout all of the clans of the Eora Nation.

Another example of the strong link between people and place, but without the suffix, can be seen with the nation name 'Eora' itself, which translates to people and from here or this place. The name Eora refers collectively to the people of the Sydney region and also translates to the name of the (Greater Sydney) region inhabited by those people.

English borrowed words
Examples of English words borrowed from Dharug are:
Names of animals: dingo, koala, wallaby, wobbegong, wombat
Trees and plants: burrawang, kurrajong, geebung, myall, waratah
The tools boomerang, a word from the Turuwal sub-group, and woomera (spear-thrower)
The word gin, a now derogatory term for an indigenous woman, is believed to derive from Dharug diyin, "woman"
 The word koradji, referring to an Aboriginal person with traditional skills in medicine, comes from Dharug.

References

Sources

External links
 The Aboriginal language of Sydney (with audio sample)
 Jeremy Steele's partial reconstruction of the Sydney language
 Bibliography of Dharug people and language resources, at the Australian Institute of Aboriginal and Torres Strait Islander Studies
 Bibliography of Eora people and language resources, at the Australian Institute of Aboriginal and Torres Strait Islander Studies

Yuin–Kuric languages
Extinct languages of New South Wales
Critically endangered languages